The 1974 Tennessee Volunteers football team (variously "Tennessee", "UT" or the "Vols") represented the University of Tennessee in the 1974 NCAA Division I football season. Playing as a member of the Southeastern Conference (SEC), the team was led by head coach Bill Battle, in his fifth year, and played their home games at Neyland Stadium in Knoxville, Tennessee. They finished the season with a record of seven wins, three losses and two ties (7–3–2 overall, 2–3–1 in the SEC). At season's end, Tennessee won the Liberty Bowl over Maryland. For the season, the Volunteers offense scored 211 points while the defense allowed 181 points.

Schedule

Roster

Team players drafted into the NFL
Despite being drafted by the National Football League, Condredge Holloway opted to play in the Canadian Football League. Holloway signed a contract with the Ottawa Rough Riders.

Reference:

References

Tennessee
Tennessee Volunteers football seasons
Liberty Bowl champion seasons
Tennessee Volunteers football